In linguistics, ordinal numerals or ordinal number words are words representing position or rank in a sequential order; the order may be of size, importance, chronology, and so on (e.g., "third", "tertiary"). They differ from cardinal numerals, which represent quantity (e.g., "three") and other types of numerals. 

In traditional grammar, all numerals, including ordinal numerals, are grouped into a separate part of speech (hence, "noun numeral" in older English grammar books).  However, in modern interpretations of English grammar, ordinal numerals are usually conflated with adjectives.

Ordinal numbers may be written in English with numerals and letter suffixes: 1st, 2nd or 2d, 3rd or 3d, 4th, 11th, 21st, 101st, 477th, etc., with the suffix acting as an ordinal indicator. Written dates often omit the suffix, although it is nevertheless pronounced. For example: 5 November 1605 (pronounced "the fifth of November ... "); November 5, 1605, ("November (the) Fifth ..."). When written out in full with "of", however, the suffix is retained: the 5th of November. In other languages, different ordinal indicators are used to write ordinal numbers.

In American Sign Language, the ordinal numbers first through ninth are formed with handshapes similar to those for the corresponding cardinal numbers with the addition of a small twist of the wrist.

English

In English, the main ordinal series is 'first', 'second', ....  It is used in a variety of rankings, including time ('the first hour of the event'), space ('the first left'), and quality ('first class cabin').

The Latinate series 'primary', 'secondary', ... is often used for importance or precedence ('primary consideration') and sequence of dependence ('secondary effect', 'secondary boycott', 'secondary industry'), though there are other uses as well ('primary school', 'primary election'). The first two in the sequence are by far the most common; 'tertiary' appears occasionally, and higher numbers are rare except in specialized contexts ('quaternary period').

The Greek series proto-, deutero-, trito-, ... is only found in prefixes, generally scholarly and technical coinages, e.g. protagonist, deuteragonist, tritagonist; protium, deuterium, tritium; Proto-Isaiah, Deutero-Isaiah. Numbers beyond three are rare; those beyond four are obscure.

The first twelve variations of ordinal numbers are given here.

The spatial and chronological ordinal numbers corresponding to cardinals from 13 to 19 are the number followed by the suffix -th, as "sixteenth". For multiples of ten, the same principle applies, with terminal -y changed to -ieth, as "sixtieth". For other numbers, the elements of the cardinal number are used, with the last word replaced by the ordinal: 23 → "twenty-third"; 523 → "five hundred twenty-third" (British English: "five hundred and twenty-third").

When speaking the numbers in fractions, the spatial/chronological numbering system is used for denominators larger than 2 (2 as the denominator of a fraction is "half" rather than "second"), with a denominator of 4 sometimes spoken as "quarter" rather than "fourth". This system is normally used for denominators less than 100 and for many powers of 10.

Chinese 

In Chinese, ordinal numbers are formed by adding 第 (pinyin: dì, Jyutping: dai6) before the cardinal numbers.

See also 
 Distributive number
 English ordinal numbers
 Multiplier (linguistics)
 Ordinal indicator for more conventions for writing ordinal numbers (super-scripting)
 Ordinal number for the related, but more formal and abstract, usage in mathematics
 Regnal ordinal
 Ordinal data, in statistics

References 

Numerals
Naming conventions